Vera Wilhelmowna Rust (born 22 July 1940), known as Vera Tschechowa, is a German producer, director, screenwriter, and retired actress, of Russian descent. She appeared in more than 50 films between 1957 and 1996. She was widely known as Elvis Presley's companion, particularly in connection with his Oral Poliomyelitis Vaccine (OPV) public booster-advocacy and which they both undertook during Presley's first year in Germany with the U.S. Army (1959).

Her mother, Ada Tschechowa, was the daughter of Michael Chekhov and Olga Chekhova. Vera herself appeared, on 6 June 1971, as one of 28 women under the banner "We've had abortions!" ("Wir haben abgetrieben!") on the cover page of the West German magazine, Stern. In that issue, 374 women publicly stated that they had had pregnancies terminated, which at that time was illegal.

Selected filmography

 Widower with Five Daughters (1957)
 The Doctor of Stalingrad (1958), as Tamara
 Angel in a Taxi (1958), as Camilla
 The Muzzle (1958)
  (1958)
 My Ninety Nine Brides (1958)
 And That on Monday Morning (1959), as Monika
 The Young Sinner (1960), as Carola
 The Bread of Those Early Years (1962), as Ulla Wickweber
 Love at Twenty (1962)
 The Curse of the Hidden Vault (1964), as Feder-Lissy
 Liebe und so weiter (1968), as Nina Michel
  (1970), as Kristina
 The First Circle (1973), as Clara
  (1975), as Corinna
 Euridice BA 2037 (1975), as Eurydice
 Erika's Passions (1976, TV film), as Franziska
 The Rider on the White Horse (1978), as Vollina Harders
 Panic Time (1980), as Frau Dr. Wunder
 Desperado City (1981), as Hilke
 The Confessions of Felix Krull (1982, TV miniseries), as Maria Pia
 Dies rigorose Leben (1983), as Salka
  (1984), as Victoria
  (1984, TV film), as Gisela
 Tarot (1986), as Charlotte
 Ein Heim für Tiere (1987–1991, TV series, 19 episodes), as Dr. Julia Gessner
 The Post Office Girl (1988, TV film), as Clara van Boolen
  (1991), as Elsa's Mother

References

External links

1940 births
Living people
German people of Russian descent
German film actresses
German television actresses
Actresses from Berlin
Best Actress German Film Award winners
20th-century German actresses
Film people from Berlin